Christians have been present in the military since after the death of Jesus, Marinus of Caesarea, Julius the Veteran, and other military saints were Christians who were soldiers, although other Christians, such as Maximilian of Tebessa, were conscientious objectors, believing that the Bible supported Christian pacifism.

Under the Emperor Diocletian, attempts were made to purge Christians from the army. However, the Roman army continued to include many Christians, and the presence of large numbers of Christians in his army may have been a factor in the conversion of Constantine I to Christianity.

The presence of Christians on both sides led to the unofficial Christmas truces of World War I, commemorated in the film Joyeux Noël.

Military chaplains minister to Christians serving in the military forces of many countries, and organisations such as the Armed Forces Christian Union (UK) and Officers' Christian Fellowship (US) are made up of Christians in the military.

Religion in The US military

Most American military members identify as Protestant and Non Denominational Christians. The majority of overall US veterans and WWII US veterans were Protestants.

See also
Christian soldier (disambiguation)
Christianity and violence
Janissary
Just War
New Testament military metaphors
Christian pacifism
Armed priests

References

Military personnel